Samuel Hollenbach (born September 9, 1983) is an American football quarterback who is currently a free agent. He was signed by the Washington Redskins as an undrafted free agent in 2007. He played college football at Maryland.

Early years
While attending Pennridge High School, Hollenbach's coach was his father, Jeff, a former Illinois quarterback.

College career
During his college career, Hollenbach went 15-9 in games he started at Quarterback. He completed 417 of 679 passes for 5,139 yards with 28 touchdowns and 26 interceptions in the Atlantic Coast Conference.

Post football career
Hollenbach is now a lead Project Engineer at Under Armour.

References
Maryland Terrapins bio
Washington Redskins bio

External links
Maryland Makes Its Mark as Quarterback U., The Washington Post, October 25, 2005.

1983 births
Living people
Players of American football from Pennsylvania
Sportspeople from Bucks County, Pennsylvania
American football quarterbacks
Maryland Terrapins football players
Washington Redskins players
People from Doylestown, Pennsylvania